Mark Cooper (born 1950, Evansville, Indiana) is an American multimedia artist based in Boston, Massachusetts working mostly in ceramics and sculptural installation as well as painting. He is best known for his large scale biomorphic fiberglass sculptures.

Education
Cooper received his Bachelor of Science at Indiana University Bloomington in 1972, and his Masters of Fine Arts, from the School of the Museum of Fine Arts, Boston at Tufts University in 1980, Boston, Massachusetts.

Career & Work

Cooper currently teaches ceramics at Boston College and is also a Regular Faculty at the School of the Museum of Fine Arts, Boston, Massachusetts.

His paintings and sculptures made with fiberglass pieces, layered with rice paper, paint, silk-screens, and varying images and patterns, "explore dualities of culture and meaning." The Museum of Fine Arts, Boston, Boston College Museum, Capital Children's Museum in Washington, DC, DeCordova Museum and Sculpture Park, and the Whitney Museum of American Art at Philip Morris, New York, New York.
He has received various public art commissions and grants from the Boston Medical Center, an Artist Fellowship Grant through the Massachusetts Cultural Council, and a Gund Travel Grant (Bali), and a special commission for the new Comme des Garçon store in New York City.

Recent exhibitions include: James and Audrey Foster Prize Finalists, Institute of Contemporary Art, Boston, Massachusetts (2013); New Blue and White, Foster Gallery, Curated by Emily Zilber Contemporary Decorative Arts, Museum of Fine Arts Boston, Massachusetts (2013); More is More, a solo exhibition at Samsøñ, Boston, Massachusetts. Most recently Cooper exhibited at the Seattle Art Fair in Seattle, Washington, with work representing a collaborative exchange with artists in Vietnam, China, Korea and Seattle. He was also a part of Seattle Art Fair's off-site exhibition at the Living Computer Museum, called A Singularity.  Mark Cooper has been represented by Samsøñ since 2012.

Articles
http://markfcooper.com/pdfs/MarkCooperReview2002.pdf
http://seattleartfair.com/projects-events/mark-cooper/#.VcZOvDBVhBc
https://news.artnet.com/market/seattle-art-fair-2015-321683
http://artdaily.com/news/80449/Seattle-Art-Fair-opens-to-more-than-4-000-visitors#.VcZO_TBVhBc

http://markfcooper.com/pdfs/AIA_SAMSON%20PROJECTS_Jan12-1.pdf

References

External links

1950 births
Living people
People from Evansville, Indiana
Artists from Boston
Indiana University Bloomington alumni
Boston College faculty
School of the Museum of Fine Arts at Tufts alumni
American multimedia artists
American ceramists
Sculptors from Massachusetts
21st-century ceramists